Ena Hadi (Greek: Ένα χάδι) is the title of the third studio album by the popular Greek artist Peggy Zina, released in 2001 by Nitro Music.

The album contains 15 tracks with music by Kyriakos Papadopoulos, Ilias Philippos, Konstantinos Pantzis and Stelios Rokkos, while the lyrics are written by the Niki Spyropoulou and Poseidonas Giannopoulos.

Track list

Singles
"Ti Th' Akouso Akoma"
"Ti Th' Akouso Akoma" was the first single released from the album. It released as a CD Single with four tracks on July 4, 2000.

"Poli Kala Pername"
"Poli Kala Pername", composed by Konstantinos Pantzis with lyrics by Poseidonas Giannopoulos was, was released on March 25, 2001 as the second single from the album. The music video of the song was directed by Kostas Kapetenidi.

Charts
The album entered the Greek Albums Chart and peaked at number 1.

References

2001 albums
Greek-language albums
Peggy Zina albums